Antonio Maccanico (4 August 1924 – 23 April 2013) was an Italian constitutional specialist and social liberal politician, who served in various capacities in the parliament and federal administrations of Italy.

Early life and education
Maccanico was born on 4 August 1924 in Avellino. He graduated in law at the University of Pisa in 1946.

Career
Maccanico began his career at the house of deputies as a referendary in June 1947. He worked in different commissions in the house. He also served as the general secretary in the office of the Italian President Sandro Pertini for nine years. He was the president of Italian investment bank, Mediobanca, from 1987 to 1988 which was privatised during his term. He succeeded Enrico Cuccia in the aforementioned post.

Maccanico was appointed minister of regional affairs and institutional problems on 13 April 1988 and was in office until 13 April 1991. However, no significant institutional reforms were developed during his tenure. He was elected senator on 6 April 1992 for the Italian Republican Party and served in the post until 1994. He was the undersecretary of state of the presidency of the cabinet in the Ciampi Government from 29 April 1993 to 9 May 1994.

Following the resignation of Prime Minister Lamberto Dini in January 1996, Maccanico was tasked with forming a government on 1 February 1996. Maccanico strongly argued that all parties should agree on the required reforms before the formation of the government. However, he was unable to form a majority, renouncing the mandate on 14 February, and thus, Italian President Oscar Luigi Scalfaro dissolved parliament on 16 February. Maccanico was elected deputy on 21 April 1996, being part of Romano Prodi's list, from the constituency of Campania 2.

On 18 May 1996, Maccanico was appointed minister of posts and communications to the cabinet led by Prime Minister Romano Prodi. In the cabinet, he was part of the Democratic Union to which he had established early in 1996. He was the father of law no. 249 dated 31 July 1997 that was the basis of Italy's communications authority. The law is also called the Maccanico law. His tenure lasted until 1998. In June 2000 he was named minister of institutional reforms to the first D'Alema government, replacing Giuliano Amato in the post, and Maccanico kept the charge even in the successive governments until 2001. In 2000 Maccanico was also elected to the chamber of deputies. In 2006, he was elected for the fourth time to the parliament with The Daisy in Campania.

Death and legacy
Maccanico died in a clinic in Rome on 23 April 2013 at the age of 88.

In 2014 the diaries of Maccanico edited by the historian Paolo Soddu were published with title Con Pertini al Quirinale. Diari 1978–1985.

References

External links

20th-century Italian jurists
1924 births
2013 deaths
Action Party (Italy) politicians
Democratic Union (Italy) politicians
The Democrats (Italy) politicians
Democracy is Freedom – The Daisy politicians
Deputies of Legislature XIII of Italy
Deputies of Legislature XIV of Italy
Government ministers of Italy
Italian Communist Party politicians
Italian political party founders
Italian Republican Party politicians
People from Avellino
Senators of Legislature XI of Italy
Senators of Legislature XV of Italy
University of Pisa alumni